Old Mill Creek is a village in Lake County, Illinois, United States. Per the 2020 census, the population was 162.

Geography
Old Mill Creek is located at  (42.421820, -87.982511).

Major streets
  Tri-State Tollway
 
  Rosecrans Road
 Edwards Road
 Hunt Club Road
 Main Street
 Old Town Ct.
 Wadsworth Road
 Millburn Road
 Stearns School Road

Demographics

2020 census

Note: the US Census treats Hispanic/Latino as an ethnic category. This table excludes Latinos from the racial categories and assigns them to a separate category. Hispanics/Latinos can be of any race.

2000 Census
As of the census of 2000, there were 251 people, 98 households, and 68 families residing in the village. The population density was 24.8 people per square mile (9.6/km). There were 104 housing units at an average density of 10.3 per square mile (4.0/km). The racial makeup of the village was 87.25% White, 2.39% African American, 6.37% Asian, 1.20% from other races, and 2.79% from two or more races. Hispanic or Latino of any race were 2.39% of the population.

There were 98 households, out of which 31.6% had children under the age of 18 living with them, 61.2% were married couples living together, 6.1% had a female householder with no husband present, and 29.6% were non-families. 23.5% of all households were made up of individuals, and 5.1% had someone living alone who was 65 years of age or older. The average household size was 2.56 and the average family size was 3.09.

In the village, the population was spread out, with 23.9% under the age of 18, 6.0% from 18 to 24, 35.5% from 25 to 44, 27.5% from 45 to 64, and 7.2% who were 65 years of age or older. The median age was 37 years. For every 100 females, there were 96.1 males. For every 100 females age 18 and over, there were 103.2 males.

The median income for a household in the village was $82,426, and the median income for a family was $92,529. Males had a median income of $50,208 versus $41,250 for females. The per capita income for the village was $43,314. None of the families and 2.7% of the population were living below the poverty line.

Notable person

 Bruce Wolf, Chicago sportscaster and radio host

References

External links
 https://oldmillcreekil.govoffice3.com

Villages in Illinois
Villages in Lake County, Illinois